The Minnesota Department of Employment and Economic Development (DEED) is the State of Minnesota’s principal economic development agency. Its mission includes supporting the economic success of individuals, businesses, and communities by improving opportunities for growth.

History
The Minnesota DEED was created in July 2003 by the merger of the Minnesota Department of Trade and Economic Development (DTED) and the Minnesota Department of Economic Security (MDES).

Divisions

Business and Community Development
The Business and Community Development (BCD) division provides financial and technical services to businesses, communities, and economic development professionals. The division promotes and assists in the expansion of exports and works with Minnesota-based companies that are interested in expansion. BCD also works with companies interested in relocating to Minnesota. Additionally, BCD helps Minnesota communities with financing infrastructure projects.

Workforce Development
The Workforce Development Division works with local and statewide partners to provide training and support to unemployed and dislocated workers, and financial assistance for businesses seeking to upgrade the skills of their workforce. Additional services include state services for the blind, rehabilitation services, local labor exchange, and disability determination. Many of these services are provided at CareerForce locations throughout the state.

Unemployment Insurance
The unemployment insurance division provides a temporary partial wage replacement to Minnesota workers who become unemployed through no fault of their own. It is an economic stabilizer and stimulator during economic downturns and helps maintain an available skilled workforce.

Communications, Analysis, and Research
The Communications, Analysis and Research Division coordinates DEED’s information resources and provides centralized services in the areas of communications, marketing, publications, economic analysis, and labor market and other research. The division also implements the state branding program—Positively Minnesota—in partnership with business, industry, education, and governmental organizations.

References

External links
Minnesota Department of Employment and Economic Development
Minnesota Trade Office
CareerForce
Minnesota Unemployment Insurance
Minnesota Works

State agencies of Minnesota
State departments of economic development in the United States